Les Baconnets is a Paris RER station. It is one of the stations for Antony, Hauts-de-Seine, and for parts of Massy, Île-de-France.

Railway stations in France opened in 1969
Réseau Express Régional stations in Hauts-de-Seine